Alice Arm is a locality, former post office, and steamer landing on the North Coast of British Columbia, Canada, located on the east side of Observatory Inlet at the mouth of the Kitsault River. There are still a number of houses standing and several seasonal homeowners who still access their houses every year. It was the location of a short rail line that accessed the mine.

Name origin
See Alice Arm for the origin of the name.

See also
Anyox
Kitsault

References

Unincorporated settlements in British Columbia
Ghost towns in British Columbia
Ports and harbours of British Columbia
North Coast of British Columbia